Stenosemus is a genus of polyplacophoran molluscs in the family Ischnochitonidae.

Taxonomy
This genus is only tentatively placed in Ischnochitonidae.

Species
 Stenosemus albus (Linnaeus, 1767)
 Stenosemus beui (O'Neill, 1987)
 Stenosemus chiversi A. J. Ferreira, 1981
 Stenosemus delicatus (Kaas, 1991)
 Stenosemus discernibilis (Kaas, 1991)
 Stenosemus dolii (Van Belle & Dell'Angelo, 1998)
 Stenosemus exaratus (Sars G. O., 1878)
 Stenosemus fijiensis Sirenko, 2017
 Stenosemus gallaecus (Carmona Zalvide, Urgorri & F. J. García, 2001)
 Stenosemus golikovi Sirenko, 1994
 Stenosemus herosae Sirenko, 2008
 Stenosemus kolesnikovi Sirenko, 1994
 Stenosemus merveae Sirenko, 2016
 Stenosemus mexicanus (Kaas, 1993)
 Stenosemus moskalevi Sirenko, 2016
 Stenosemus nitens Sirenko, 2020
 Stenosemus perforatus (Kaas, 1990)
 Stenosemus philippei Sirenko, 2017
 † Stenosemus radiatus Dell'Angelo, Lesport, Cluzaud & Sosso, 2020 
 Stenosemus robustus (Kaas, 1991)
 Stenosemus sharpii (Pilsbry, 1896)
 Stenosemus simplicissimus (Thiele, 1906)
 Stenosemus solomonensis Sirenko, 2017
 Stenosemus stearnsii (Dall, 1902)
 Stenosemus substriatus (Kaas & Van Belle, 1990)
 Stenosemus vanbellei (Kaas, 1985)
 Stenosemus vitreolus (Kaas, 1985)

References

External links
 Middendorff T.A. (1847). Beiträge zu einer Malakozoologia Rossica. Mémoires de l'Académie Impériale des Sciences de Saint Pétersbourg. Sciences Mathématiques, Physiques et Naturelles. 2e Partie, Sciences Naturelles. 6(1): 67-200
 Sars, G.O. (1878). Bidrag til Kundskaben om Norges arktiske Fauna. I. Mollusca Regionis Arcticae Norvegiae. Oversigt over de i Norges arktiske Region Forekommende Bløddyr. Brøgger, Christiania. xiii + 466 pp., pls 1-34 & I-XVIII

Ischnochitonidae
Chiton families